Addington is a civil parish in Restigouche County, New Brunswick, Canada.

For governance purposes it was divided between the city of Campbellton and the Restigouche rural district, both of which are members of the Restigouche Regional Service Commission.

Before the 2023 governance reform, the northern part of the parish was heavily divided, with (moving upriver from the eastern parish line) the city of Campbellton, the village of Atholville, the village of Tide Head and the local service district of Flatlands, which straddled the western parish line; the (LSD) of Glencoe was inland of Tide Head and Flatlands, along Route 17 and Route 275, with Atholville extending inland around the loop of Route 275; the remainder of the parish's mainland formed the LSD of the parish of Addington. The islands in the Restigouche River were divided between Flatlands and Tide Head, though the boundary the village claimed differed from those recognised by the Regional Service Commission's map of Flatlands. The 2023 reform amalgamated Addington and Tide Head with Campbellton, annexing Glencoe with two parts of the LSD of the parish of Addington on either side of Walker Road, allowing a smoother boundary, while the boundary between the river islands was settled; Flatlands and the remainder of the parish LSD became part of the rural district.

Origin of name
The parish was named in honour of Henry Unwin Addington, a diplomat who was appointed in 1826 as a plenipotentiary in the boundary negotiations with the United States. He was the nephew of Henry Addington, Prime Minister of the United Kingdom 1801–1804.

The other plenipotentiary in 1826 was William Huskisson, for whom Huskisson Parish in Kent County was named at the same time.

History
Addington was erected in 1827 in Gloucester County from Beresford Parish. The parish comprised the area north of the prolongation of the southern line of modern Beresford and between the Benjamin and Upsalquitch Rivers.

In 1840 Restigouche County was reorganised following its erection. Addington was reduced to its modern eastern boundary while having its western boundary changed to a line due south from the mouth of the Upsalquitch River.

In 1879 Eldon Parish was dissolved and the area added to Addington.

In 1896 Eldon was reërected with altered boundaries, giving Addington its modern boundaries.

Boundaries
Addington Parish is bounded:

 on the north by the Quebec provincial boundary, running through the Restigouche River;
 on the east by a line running true south from the most eastern point of the western side of the mouth of Walkers Brook, which runs through Campbellton;
 on the south by the Northumberland County line;
 on the west by a line beginning on the county line about at a point about 2.4 kilometres east of Bald Mountain Brook, then running true north to the southeastern corner of a grant to Thomas Gracie, about 1 kilometre west of Route 17 and 2 kilometres south of Evergreen Road, then running northwesterly along the western edge of Glenlivet Settlement to its northwestern corner, then along the prolongation of the eastern line of a grant to John Justason and the Justason grant to strike the Restigouche River near the lower end of Bell Island;
 including all the river islands in front.

Communities
Communities at least partly within the parish. bold indicates an incorporated municipality

 Campbellton
 Christopher
 Flatlands
 Glen Levit
 Popelogan Depot
 Tide Head
 Atholville
 Colebrooke Settlement
 Dubé Settlement
 Glencoe
 Malauze
 Atholville
 McKendrick
 Saint-Arthur
 Val-d'Amour
 Val-Melanson

Bodies of water
Bodies of water at least partly within the parish.

 North Branch Charlo River
 Popelogan River
 Popelogan Lake Branch River
 Restigouche River
 Ferguson Creek
 Gordon Creek
 more than fifteen officially named lakes
 Upsalquitch River
 Northwest Upsalquitch River
 Southeast Upsalquitch River

Islands
Islands at least partly within the parish.

 Apple Island
 Boulton Island
 Butters Islands (Apple Island)
 Delaney Island
 Dickson Island
 Duffs Island
 Duncan Island
 Ferguson Island
 Gillis Island
 Long Island
 McBeath Island
 Moses Island
 Murray Islands (Murray Island)
 Prichards Island (Pritchard Island)
 Smith Island

Other notable places
Parks, historic sites, and other noteworthy places at least partly within the parish.
 Berry Brook Protected Natural Area
 Halls Shed Lake Protected Natural Area
 McDougalls Brook Protected Natural Area
 Mount Carleton Provincial Park
 Mount Carleton Wildlife Management Area
 Northwest Upsalquitch River Protected Natural Area
 Popelogan Depot Protected Natural Area
 Squaw Cap Mountain Protected Natural Area
 Sugarloaf Provincial Park
 Upsalquitch Forks Protected Natural Area

Demographics
Parish population total does not include Tide Head or portions in Atholville and Campbellton. Revised census figures based on the 2023 local governance reforms have not been released.

Population

Language

Access Routes
Highways and numbered routes that run through the parish, including external routes that start or finish at the parish limits:

Highways

Principal Routes

Secondary Routes:

External Routes:
None

See also
List of parishes in New Brunswick

Notes

References

External links
 Village of Atholville
 City of Campbellton

Parishes of Restigouche County, New Brunswick
Local service districts of Restigouche County, New Brunswick